Delano van Crooij (born 5 June 1991) is a Dutch professional footballer who plays as a goalkeeper for Eredivisie club Sparta Rotterdam.

Club career
Born in Venlo, Van Crooij played in the VVV-Venlo youth system and joined FC Zwolle in 2011 as their third goalkeeper. He was released by Zwolle a year later and had a trial with Bulgarian side Etar Tarnovo, while playing for amateur side Kwiek Venlo. That did not materialize and after two years at Deurne, he chose to rejoin VVV over a move to SC Gestel. On 24 October 2020, he conceded 13 goals in 13–0 loss against Ajax as VVV-Venlo's goalkeeper, which is a negative record in Holland..

On 22 September 2022, van Crooij signed a one-season contract with Sparta Rotterdam.

Personal life
He is Vito van Crooij's older brother.

Honours
Zwolle
 Eerste Divisie: 2011–12

VVV-Venlo
 Eerste Divisie: 2016–17

References

External links
 

1991 births
Living people
Dutch footballers
Footballers from Venlo
Association football goalkeepers
Eredivisie players
Eerste Divisie players
VVV-Venlo players
PEC Zwolle players
Sparta Rotterdam players